Denmark–Nepal relations are foreign relations between Denmark and Nepal. Denmark has had an embassy in Kathmandu from 1992 to 2017 and since then an Honorary Consulate. Nepal has had an embassy in Copenhagen since 2007. Nepal and Denmark established diplomatic relations on 15 December 1967.

Aid

Denmark has given aid to Nepal since 1990. In 1973, 20 million DKK was given to Nepal for the economic cooperation. In 1997, Denmark agreed to provide assistance of 644 million DKK to projects.

200 million DKK was given to the education cooperation in 2003. In 2006, Danish Minister for Development Cooperation Ulla Tørnæs visited Nepal. Denmark assisted with 70 million DKK again for education in 2009. Denmark have for 20 years assisted Nepalese families with electricity and renewable energy.

Children Nepal Denmark
Children Nepal Denmark was established in October 2001. When Peer Ortvalds visited Nepal in 1999, he was inspired by Children Nepal Denmark's achievements. Peer Ortvald decided that he would continue to help disadvantaged children in Nepal after his return to Denmark.

Trade 
Denmark exports food and machinery to Nepal, while Nepal exports pashminas to Denmark.

See also  
 Foreign relations of Denmark 
 Foreign relations of Nepal
 Nepal–European Union relations

References

External links 
 Danish development cooperation with Nepal
 Danish Cultural Strategy for Nepal

Nepal
Bilateral relations of Nepal